Jeep Grand Wagoneer may refer to:
 a variant of the Jeep Wagoneer (SJ), produced from 1984 to 1991
 a variant of the Jeep Grand Cherokee (ZJ), produced from 1992 to 1993
 Grand Wagoneer (WS), an SUV made by Jeep from 2021 onwards

See also 
 Jeep Wagoneer

Grand Wagoneer